is a district located in central Kanagawa Prefecture, Japan. It currently consists of only one town, Aikawa, and one village, Kiyokawa. The city of Atsugi was formerly part of Aikō District.

Towns and villages 
Aikawa
Kiyokawa

History

Aikō District was one of the ancient subdivisions of Sagami Province, extending from central Sagami north to the border of Musashi Province between the Sagami River and the Tanzawa Mountains. The district offices were located in what is now part of Atsugi. The area was part of a vast shōen controlled by the Ōe clan, and their descendants, the Mōri clan of Chōshū from the Heian period through the Sengoku period. It later became a contested area between the later Hōjō clan of Odawara and the Takeda clan of Kai. In the Edo period, it was nominally part of Odawara Domain, although large portions were tenryō territory controlled by the shōgun in Edo through various hatamoto. From 1706, a branch of the Ōkubo clan in Odawara was permitted to establish the Ogino-Yamanaka Domain on a portion of the district. Other portions of the district came under control of Karasuyama Domain of Shimōsa Province.

With the Meiji Restoration of 1868, Ogino-Yamanaka Domain came under the control of Shizuoka Domain, while remaining territories became part of the new Kanagawa Prefecture. With the abolition of the han system in 1871, former Ogino-Yamanaka Domain became Ogino-Yamanaka Prefecture, and subsequently part of the short-lived Ashigaru Prefecture. It merged with Kanagawa Prefecture in 1876.

Timeline
 The new Aikō and Tsukui Districts were established in 1878.
 In 1889, Aikō District was administratively divided into the following municipalities:
 one town (Atsugi)
 16 villages (Koayu, Tamagawa, Nanmori, Mita, Tanasawa, Shimokawairi, Tsumada, Oikawa, Hayashi, Echi, Ogino, Aikawa, Takamine, Nakatsu, Susugaya and Miyagase)
 In 1940, Aikawa Village was elevated to town status.
 In 1946, Mutsuai Village was created through the merger of six villages (Mita, Tanasawa, Shimokawairi, Tsumada, Oikawa and Hayashi).
 In 1955:
 January 15 – The village of Takamine was absorbed into Aikawa.
 February 1 – The village of Mutsuai merged with the town of Atsugi and three other villages (Koayu, Tamagawa and Nanmori) to form the city of Atsugi.
 July 8 – The village of Echi was absorbed into Atsugi.
 In 1956:
 September 30 – Kiyokawa Village was created through the merger of two villages (Susugaya and Miyagase).
 September 30 – The village of Nakatsu was absorbed into Aikawa.
 September 30 – The village of Ogino was absorbed into Atsugi.

Merger table

Districts in Kanagawa Prefecture